King Cove is a city in Aleutians East Borough, Alaska, United States. As of the 2010 census, its population was 938, up from 792 in 2000, but at the 2020 census this had reduced to 757.

Geography
King Cove is on the Pacific side of the Alaska Peninsula. It lies at approximately 55° 03′ N Latitude and 162° 19′ W Longitude.
  

Demographics

King Cove first appeared on the 1940 U.S. Census as an unincorporated village. It formally incorporated in 1949.

As of the census of 2000, there were 792 people, 170 households, and 116 families residing in the city. There were 207 housing units at an average density of 8.2 per square mile (3.2/km2). The racial makeup of the city was 15.03% White, 1.64% Black or African American, 46.72% Native American, 26.77% Asian, 0.13% Pacific Islander, 5.93% from other races, and 3.79% from two or more races. 7.45% of the population were Hispanic or Latino of any race.

There were 170 households, out of which 45.3% had children under the age of 18 living with them, 46.5% were married couples living together, 15.9% had a female householder with no husband present, and 31.2% were non-families. 25.3% of all households were made up of individuals, and 2.9% had someone living alone who was 65 years of age or older. The average household size was 2.90 and the average family size was 3.53.

In the city, the age distribution of the population shows 21.3% under the age of 18, 11.9% from 18 to 24, 41.0% from 25 to 44, 22.7% from 45 to 64, and 3.0% who were 65 years of age or older. The median age was 35 years. For every 100 females, there were 147.5 males. For every 100 females age 18 and over, there were 166.2 males.

The median income for a household in the city was $45,893, and the median income for a family was $47,188. Males had a median income of $30,714 versus $19,125 for females. The per capita income for the city was $17,791. About 3.3% of families and 11.9% of the population were below the poverty line, including 1.7% of those under age 18 and 27.3% of those age 65 or over.

Economy
King Cove,  SW of Anchorage at the end of the Alaska Peninsula, is home to PeterPan Seafoods' largest processing facility. King Crab, bairdi and opilio tanner crab, pollock, cod, salmon, halibut and black cod harvested in the Bering Sea and the Gulf of Alaska are processed throughout the year. The plant, with origins back to the early 1900s, has the largest salmon canning capacity of any plant in Alaska. All five species of salmon are abundant in the waters near King Cove.

Salmon remains a major part of the annual operation, but in recent years the plant has expanded and streamlined whitefish operations. The plant produces several product forms including pollock fillet block, shatterpack fillets, mince and surimi. Cod shatterpack fillets and salt cod are mainstays. At peak seasons, both winter and summer, nearly 500 employees staff the operation. King Cove's economy depends almost completely on the year-round commercial fishing and seafood processing industries. The PeterPan Seafoods' facility is one of the largest cannery operations under one roof in Alaska. 76 residents hold commercial fishing permits. Income is supplemented by subsistence activities.

The community is served by King Cove Airport, a state-owned public use airport with a gravel runway. A locally based FAA certificated Part 135 company called Eider Air provides on demand air-taxi service and charter operations to villagers and visitors.  Grant Aviation also flies to King Cove, and has the contract for mail services.

It is also served by the Alaska Marine Highway, the state-run ferry service which connects it with Cold Bay in the west and Sand Point in the east.

Proposed road to Cold Bay 
A partially completed road between King Cove and Cold Bay is awaiting approval through the United States Department of the Interior. This road would pass through the Izembek National Wildlife Refuge, causing irreparable damage to the preserve per governmental assessments according to a report generated by The Wilderness Society.  The previous negative decision by former Interior Secretary Sally Jewell is being reconsidered to include a land swap.  Proponents of the road state it would help local citizens in need of medical evacuation when airplanes can not land or take off from the local airport due to darkness or weather conditions. Opponents contend the road's main purpose is, as it always has been, to provide a link between King Cove and a nearby airport for commercial reasons. No evidence has been put forward to support a road would be safer in difficult weather condition than air transport. On 22 January 2018, Interior Secretary Ryan Zinke signed a land swap agreement to allow construction of the road, but U.S. District Court Judge Sharon Gleason blocked it in a ruling in March 2019, on the grounds that Secretary Zinke had failed to respond to the environmental concerns which Secretary Jewell had cited in justifying blocking the proposed land swap. In 2020, Zinke's successor as Interior Secretary, David Bernhardt, approved a revised land swap agreement, and specifically responded to those environmental concerns; U.S District Court Judge John W. Sedwick blocked the revised land swap agreement as well, on the grounds that Secretary Bernhardt's response to the environmental issues was inadequate. In August 2020, the Trump administration appealed Judge Sedwick's ruling to the United States Court of Appeals for the Ninth Circuit. In March 2021, the Biden administration announced that it would continue the appeal started by the Trump administration, contrary to the expectations of many observers, who assumed the Biden administration would take the opposite decision.

Healthcare

The King Cove Community Health Clinic is run by the Eastern Aleutian Tribes and provides routine medical care, behavioral health, and emergency care services.  The clinic is open Monday through Friday during normal business hours, closed for all Alaskan and Federal holidays. After hours emergencies are handled by on-call practitioners.  There is an active local emergency medical services group who provide ambulance service. Care is also provided through Community Health Aide Practitioners, which are unique to Alaska.

Education
Aleutians East Borough School District (AEBSD) operates the King Cove School.

As of 2019 the King Cove School had 13 teachers and approximately 85 students.

References

Cities in Alaska
Cities in Aleutians East Borough, Alaska
Populated coastal places in Alaska on the Pacific Ocean